Richard Walsh is Irish financier, sporting investor, head of operations in E3 Sports Partnership, president of FC Stumbras.

Richard graduated from University College Cork with a bachelor's degree in Law.

Career
Since 2013 Richard is a Head of Operations in a British sports agency E3 Sports.

In 2016 Richard led takeover of FC Stumbras football club, based in Kaunas, Lithuania. The other investment partners were Portuguese coach Mariano Barreto - a man with numerous sports contacts, E3 Property and E3 Sports agency co-shareholder Mark Lenher and football club management specialist Carlos Olavo Mesquita da Silva. The investors identified Lithuania as the perfect place to train players and sell them off with a profit. Their business model was to build a talent factory, and achieve profit by selling players abroad. After looking at opportunities in Portugal, the pair turned their attention on Lithuania, which has one of the lowest minimum wage requirements in Europe and where half the top league's eight teams typically qualify for continental competitions every year. Although low profile, the first international transfer took place in 2018-2019 season winter transfer window, 18 year old Vilius Armalas signed up for S.L. Benfica.

In June 2019 FC Stumbras was reported to be in difficult financial situation. The club was stripped of UEFA license, preventing the participation in the UEFA Europa League competition. Richard Walsh protested by withdrawing the team from the league game, and tweeting through official club Twitter account "FC Stumbras will not play our A lyga game today. This is due to lack of support and engagement from the LFF in these challenging times for our Club."

Talking about football industry in an interview Richard admitted "I can’t say I have found more difficult people than people in the football industry, I find them anything but truthful and straightforward."

References

1971 births
Living people
Alumni of University College Cork
FC Stumbras
Irish financial businesspeople